Acacia aneura var. argentea is a variety of Acacia aneura that is endemic to Western Australia.

See also
 
 List of Acacia species

References

External links
 Flora of Australia Volume 11B (2001) figure 67.

aneura var. argentea
argentea
Endemic flora of Western Australia
Fabales of Australia
Acacias of Western Australia
Trees of Australia
Drought-tolerant trees
Taxa named by Leslie Pedley